The women's PTVI triathlon was part of the Triathlon at the 2022 Commonwealth Games program. The competition was held on 31 July 2022 in Sutton Park near Sutton Coldfield, West Midlands. The event featured nine triathletes from six nations, and nine sighted guides. This was the second women's paratriathlon at the Commonwealth Games, and the first for athletes with a visual impairment.

Schedule
All times are British Summer Time

Competition format

The race was held over the "sprint distance" and consisted of  swimming,  road bicycling, and  road running. Triathletes were selected on the basis of World Triathlon para-triathlon PTVI rankings, with one quota held over for the bipartite invitation process, awarded to Juliet Mwongeli of Kenya, though ultimately she did not contest the race.

Athletes

References

Triathlon at the 2022 Commonwealth Games